JCT may refer to:

 JCT FC, a former Indian football club
 Jerusalem College of Technology, in Jerusalem
 Joint Collaborative Team on Video Coding
 Joint Committee on Taxation, of the United States Congress
 Joint Contracts Tribunal, in the United Kingdom
 J. C. Tenorio Enterprises
 Juxtaglomerular cell tumor
 Krymchak language, a moribund language spoken in Crimea
Jordan curve theorem, a topology theorem

See also
 Junction (disambiguation)